Protein tyrosine phosphatase receptor-type R is an enzyme that in humans is encoded by the PTPRR gene.

Function 

The protein encoded by this gene is a member of the protein tyrosine phosphatase (PTP) family. PTPs are known to be signaling molecules that regulate a variety of cellular processes including cell growth, differentiation, mitotic cycle, and oncogenic transformation. This PTP possesses an extracellular region, a single transmembrane region, and a single intracellular catalytic domains, and thus represents a receptor-type PTP. The similar gene predominantly expressed in mouse brain was found to associate with, and thus regulate the activity and cellular localization of MAP kinases. The rat counterpart of this gene was reported to be regulated by the nerve growth factor, which suggested the function of this gene in neuronal growth and differentiation.

Interactions 

PTPRR has been shown to interact with MAPK7.

References

Further reading